Sigfred and Halfdan were two brothers who figured as Kings of the Danes in 873. Little is known about them; they are the last Danish rulers recorded by contemporary sources before the 930s.

Diplomacy with the East Frankish Kingdom

The last known ruler of Gudfred's dynasty, Horik II, died sometime after 864. Nine years later, in 873, we encounter two brothers who were co-rulers of the Danish realm, Sigfred and Halfdan. At Easter time in that year, Sigfred dispatched envoys to Biesenstätt close to Worms in East Francia, who met with King Louis the German. The envoys demanded that Danish traders would be allowed to pass the border to Saxony. Louis agreed to that. Later in the same year, in August, Sigfred's brother Halfdan sent envoys to Louis in Metz in a similar issue. They handed over a sword with golden handle as a gift from Halfdan, and asked Louis to accept the brothers as his "sons". Oaths of peace were sworn between the Danes and Franks. They agreed to meet later on at the Eider river, though no such meeting is recorded. This shows that South Jutland was part of their kingdom.

Possible identities

For chronological reasons Sigfred and Halfdan were probably not sons of Horik II. There has been some speculation about their possible identity with contemporary persons with the same names. A Halfdan was a king over the Danes who invaded England in these years, meeting a violent end in the Irish Sea in 877. Later tradition knows him as a son of the legendary Viking ruler Ragnar Lodbrok. It might be significant that this Halfdan is not recorded by Anglo-Saxon sources during the year 873. Some scholars, such as Rory McTurk, have pleaded for the identity of the two figures. McTurk speculates that Sigfred could be the historical prototype of Sigurd Snake-in-the-Eye, son of Lodbrok and king in Denmark according to the later sagas. It has also been suggested that Sigfred was the same figure as a Viking ruler of that name who besieged Paris in 885 and was later slain in Frisia in 887. In the cataclysmic Battle of Leuven (891), two Danish Viking kings called Sigfred and Gudfred are reported slain at the hands of the East Frankish King Arnulf of Carinthia. The name Sigfred might be a mistake on the part of the annalist, and refer to the Sigfred who was killed in 887. The later account of Adam of Bremen implies that Sigfred and Gudfred were also kings in the Danish homeland. According to Norse tradition as retold by Adam, the two kings were succeeded in Denmark by a certain Helge.

References

9th-century Danish monarchs